Abu Yahya Abu Bakr ibn Abd al-Haqq (died 1258) was a Marinid ruler.

Life 
He was the son of Abd al-Haqq I and the brother of both Uthman I and Muhammad I. He shared, in advance, Morocco among the various Marinid clans then grouped together in the east of Upper Moulouya. He captured the territory of Meknes which became the first Marinid capital, but the Almohad Abu al-Hasan as-Said resumed the offensive and Abu Yahya retreated to eastern Morocco. as-Said took the opportunity to attack Yaghmurasen Ibn Zyan, founder of the kingdom of Tlemcen, but he was killed and Abu Yahya wiped out what remained of the Almohad army in Guercif. Abu Yahya now controls all of eastern Morocco, captured Fez in 1248 and reached the ocean. The fight against the Almohads continued for many years, he took them from behind by conquering Tafilalt and when he died of illness in 1258, the Almohads only had the High Atlas, the Sous, the region of Marrakesh and the area between this city and Oum Er-Rbia River.

References

1258 deaths
13th-century Berber people
13th-century monarchs in Africa
13th-century Moroccan people
Marinid sultans of Morocco
Year of birth missing